Juan José Román Mangas (born December 23, 1962) is a Spanish sprint canoer who competed from the late 1980s to the mid-1990s. He won a complete set of medals at the ICF Canoe Sprint World Championships with a gold (K-2 500 m: 1991), a silver (K-2 1000 m: 1991), and a bronze (K-2 500 m: 1993).

Román also competed in four Summer Olympics, earning his best finish of fourth in the K-2 500 m event at Barcelona in 1992.

As of 2009, Román is President of the Royal Spanish Canoe Federation and organizing committee chair of the 2009 ICF Canoe Slalom World Championships held in La Seu d'Urgell, Spain.

References
2009 ICF Canoe Slalom World Championships August 2009 newsletter featuring Román. - accessed 9 September 2009.

1962 births
Canoeists at the 1984 Summer Olympics
Canoeists at the 1988 Summer Olympics
Canoeists at the 1992 Summer Olympics
Canoeists at the 1996 Summer Olympics
Living people
Olympic canoeists of Spain
Spanish male canoeists
Spanish referees and umpires
ICF Canoe Sprint World Championships medalists in kayak